Øssur Hansen (born 7 January 1971) is a Faroese football midfielder/defender who currently played for B68 Toftir in the Faroese Premier League. Hansen is amongst the 10 most capped players of the Faroe Islands national team with 51 matches.

Club career
He has played most of his career with B68 Toftir, but has also played with GÍ Gøta, B36 Tórshavn and a number of smaller Danish Clubs.

International career
Øssur Hansen made his debut for the Faroe Islands in May 1992 against Norway. He played 51 senior international matches scoring 2 goals, his last match was the famous October 2002 1–2 loss against Germany in Hanover.

He has scored two international goals, both of which proved indispensable; a penalty equalizer in a 2–1 victory away to Malta on 30 April 1997 and, most famously, a stunning free kick equalizer deep in injury time in a 2–2 draw against Slovenia on 3 September 2000. He is the sixth most capped player for the Faroe Islands national side.

International goals
Scores and results list Faroe Islands' goal tally first.

References

 FaroeSoccer.com
 Football.fo

External links
 Profile on the B68 Toftir website

1971 births
Living people
Faroese footballers
Faroe Islands international footballers
B68 Toftir players
Vejle Boldklub players
B36 Tórshavn players
Boldklubben af 1893 players
GÍ Gøta players
People from Toftir
Association football midfielders